The chapters of the manga series Tsubasa: Reservoir Chronicle were written and illustrated by Clamp, a creative team of four manga authors. The series premiered in Japan in Weekly Shōnen Magazine in May 2003, and after 233 chapters, ended in October 2009. The plot follows Sakura, the princess of Clow Kingdom, and Syaoran, a young archaeologist and her childhood friend, on a quest to recover Sakura's memories, which have been scattered throughout many worlds in the form of feathers. Dimensional Witch Yūko Ichihara sends them with two people who also have wishes that require travelling through worlds,  Kurogane and Fai D. Flowright, and Mokona, a magical creature with the power to transport them through dimensions.

The chapters were collected in twenty-eight tankōbon volumes by Kodansha, with the first volume released on August 12, 2003 and volume 28 released on November 17, 2009. Each chapter is called , French for "Chapter". All the volumes were also released in deluxe edition at the same time of the originals' release, containing color pages and new illustrations. A new manga titled Tsubasa World Chronicle Nirai Kanai Hen started seriazation in Kodansha's Magaznine Special in August 2014. The series follows the "original Syaoran", Fai, Kurogane and Mokona in a journey to a country where they learn they can start a ritual for reincarnations.

The first series has been adapted into a 52 episode anime series titled Tsubasa Chronicle animated by Bee Train and directed by Kōichi Mashimo. Other animated adaptions but produced by Production I.G include an anime film, The Princess in the Birdcage Kingdom, a three part original video animation (OVA) series, Tsubasa Tokyo Revelations, and another two part OVA series, Tsubasa Shunraiki.

Tsubasa: Reservoir Chronicle was one of the first four manga series licensed for English release in North America by Del Rey Manga, and was acquired together with Mobile Suit Gundam SEED, Negima! Magister Negi Magi, and xxxHolic in January 2004. Del Rey Manga released the first volume of the series on April 27, 2004, and the last one on November 23, 2010. Tanoshimi, the United Kingdom branch of Random House, published the first 14 volumes as published by Del Rey in the United Kingdom, between August 3, 2006 and June 5, 2008. The series is also licensed for an English-language release in Singapore by Chuang Yi, who released volume 27 on March 23, 2010.


Volume list

Tsubasa: Reservoir Chronicle

Tsubasa: World Chronicle: Nirai Kanai-hen

Notes

References 

Chapters
Tsubasa: Reservoir Chronicle